Langenlois is a town at the Kamp river in the Kamptal, district of Krems-Land in the Austrian state of Lower Austria. Famous for its wine production, it is also home to the Loisium, a centre celebrating and advertising the local wine and built by the American deconstructionist architect Steven Holl.

Population

References

Cities and towns in Krems-Land District